Platycheirus peltatus is a Palearctic species of hoverfly.

Description
External images
For terms, see: Morphology of Diptera. Tibiae 2 is uniformly broadened from base to apex, sometimes with a further swelling on apical 1/5. Metatarsae 1 is greatly enlarged. Dusting on frons is not well-defined. Short and broad tergites 6 and 7 and relatively broad posterior margin of tergite give the abdomen a blunt ended form.

See references for determination.

Distribution
Palearctic: Norway, Sweden, Finland, Denmark, Ireland, Britain, Germany, the Netherlands, the Ardennes and Vosges mountains, the Loire floodplain, the Rhine valley, the Pyrenees and the Alps, the former Yugoslavia; Altai mountains (Siberia), and Japan.

Biology
Habitat: fen and humid grassland and in association with tall herb vegetation of flushes in grassland; in open areas in humid Fagus, Abies forest.
It flies May to August.

References

Diptera of Europe
Syrphinae
Insects described in 1822